Astrid Skei Høsøien is a Norwegian handball player. She played 81 matches for the Norway women's national handball team between 1962 and 1971.  She participated at the 1971 World Women's Handball Championship, where the Norwegian team placed 7th.

References

Year of birth missing (living people)
Living people
Norwegian female handball players
20th-century Norwegian women